The 1st edition of the 1979 Indian Ocean Games were held in Réunion. Réunion were the champions, beating Seychelles in the final 2-1. 

All games were played at the Stade Michel Volnay in St-Pierre, Réunion.

Group stage

Group A

Group A

Qualification Play Off

Knockout stage

Semifinals

Third place match

1 The match was forfeited and Comoros were awarded third-place as Mauritius were unable to travel to Réunion for the match.

Final

See also
Indian Ocean Island Games
Football at the Indian Ocean Island Games

References
Reunion, 1979 at RSSSF

1979
Indian Ocean Games 1979